Vourvoulos is a village on the island of Santorini in Greece. It is located 3,7 kilometers northeast of the capital Fira, built on a slope facing the east shore of the island. Vourvoulos is part of the Thira region and had 535 permanent inhabitants according to the Greek census of 2011.

See also
Raid on Santorini

References

Santorini
Populated places in Thira (regional unit)